Radcliffe Lawrence (born 13 January 1949) is a former Jamaican cyclist. He competed in the individual road race and team pursuit events at the 1972 Summer Olympics.

References

External links
 

1949 births
Living people
Jamaican male cyclists
Olympic cyclists of Jamaica
Cyclists at the 1972 Summer Olympics
Place of birth missing (living people)